Kevin Gerard Barry (10 November 1920 – 25 March 2002) was an Irish equestrian. He competed in two events at the 1956 Summer Olympics.

References

External links
 

1920 births
2002 deaths
Irish male equestrians
Olympic equestrians of Ireland
Equestrians at the 1956 Summer Olympics